The Huon Times (1910–1933), later the Huon & Derwent Times (1933–1942), was an English language newspaper published in Franklin, Tasmania, Australia.

History 
The newspaper was first published on 16 February 1910 by Sydney Wentworth Addison  the manager-editor of Huon Newspaper Co., Ltd. It was published bi-weekly until 1931 when it became a weekly newspaper.

In 1933 the name of the publication was changed to Huon & Derwent Times, and an additional section was included that targeted readership in the Derwent Valley region. Publication was suspended by the Board of Directors in 1942 with the hope that it would be reinstated at the resumption of peace.

Digitisation 
The Huon Times and the Huon & Derwent Times have been digitised as part of the Australian Newspapers Digitisation Program of the National Library of Australia.

See also 
 List of newspapers in Australia
 List of newspapers in Tasmania

References

External links

Defunct newspapers published in Tasmania
Newspapers on Trove